Hugh Armstrong (born 20 September 1994) is an Irish long-distance runner. He competed in the men's race at the 2020 World Athletics Half Marathon Championships held in Gdynia, Poland.

References

External links 
 

Living people
1994 births
Place of birth missing (living people)
Irish male long-distance runners
Irish male marathon runners